The XII Army Corps was a military formation belonging to the Spanish Republican Army that fought during the Spanish Civil War. Formed by veteran units, throughout the war it took part in prominent intervention in some of the main battles of the war, such as Aragon or the Ebro.

History 
The formation was created in June 1937, within the Eastern Army. At the end of August some of its units intervened in the Zaragoza Offensive, distinguishing the 25th Division in the Battle of Belchite.

In March 1938, at the beginning of the Aragon Offensive, the XII Army Corps had established its headquarters in Alcorisa and integrated the 24th, 30th and 44th divisions; it covered the front that ran from the Ebro river to Vivel del Río Martín. During the withdrawal from Aragon, the formation suffered significant losses and was undone. After the republican zone was cut in two, it was isolated in Catalonia. After being briefly dissolved, the XII Corps was rebuilt  and assigned to Ebro Army, grouping within the divisions 16th, 44th and 56th. The militia major Etelvino Vega was appointed as the new commander of the XII Army Corps.

The 16th and 44th divisions came to participate in the fighting on the Ebro, supporting the forces of the V and XV army corps. The 56th Division remained on the Segre front, where it intervened in the attacks against Vilanova de la Barca and Seròs.

At the beginning of the Catalonia Offensive the XII Army Corps covered the line of the Segre River. Its units, however they had a bad performance against the nationalist offensive; the 56th Division was practically disbanded, while the 16th Division was powerless to offer an organized defense. As a consequence, Etelvino Vega was instantly dismissed at the beginning of January 1939, being replaced by Francisco Galán. The XII Army Corps, however, was unable to resist the enemy pressure and undertook the retreat towards the French border.

Controls 
 Commanders
 Pedro Sánchez Plaza;
 Claudio Martín Barco;
 Etelvino Vega;
 Francisco Galán;

 Commissars
 Juan Moles Martínez, of the ERC;
 Virgilio Llanos Manteca, of the PSUC;
 Saturnino Pérez Martínez, of the CNT;

 Chiefs of Staff
 Luis Fernández Ortigosa;
 Anastasio Santiago Rojo;
 Pedro Ferrando Laura;
 Ángel Calvo Herrera;

Order of battle

Notes

References

Bibliography 
 
 
 
 
 
 
 
 
 
 
 
 
 

Military units and formations established in 1937
Military units and formations disestablished in 1938
Military units and formations established in 1938
Military units and formations disestablished in 1939
Corps of Spain
Military units and formations of the Spanish Civil War
Military history of Spain
Armed Forces of the Second Spanish Republic
1937 establishments in Spain
1938 disestablishments in Spain
1938 establishments in Spain
1939 disestablishments in Spain